Magdalena Fręch was the defending champion, but chose to compete at the US Open instead.

Réka Luca Jani won the title, defeating Noma Noha Akugue in the final, 6–3, 7–6(7–4).

Seeds
All seeds receive a bye into the second round.

Draw

Finals

Top half

Section 1

Section 2

Bottom half

Section 3

Section 4

References

External links
Draws

Kuchyně Gorenje Prague Open - Singles